Dorlis (born February 23, 1982) is the stage name for a Japanese musician from Okayama, Okayama Prefecture. She started out in classical guitar, but at about age 17 became a street musician and dropped out of high school. In time, she became a jazz and swing musician. Her music has at times been deemed nostalgic because of its swing revival style. This makes her work somewhat analogous to American swing revivalists like The Brian Setzer Orchestra or Big Bad Voodoo Daddy. She is primarily a jazz singer, though also is a guitarist. She is signed with Avex Group's Rhythm Zone sublabel. She used to be connected with Victor Entertainment.

Discography
swingin' street (February 18, 2004) 
swingin' street 2 (June 29, 2005) 
swingin' party (November 16, 2005)
swingin' street 3 (June 6, 2007)
swingin' singin' playin''' (June 25, 2008)swingin' street 4 (January 27, 2010)Rock'n dorlisBest & Album Cover "dorlis"'' (June 20, 2012)

External links
Official blog in Japanese
Dorlis Blog (Old livedoor Blog) in Japanese
Dorlis at Victor Entertainment in Japanese
Dorlis at Avex Network in Japanese

Japanese jazz musicians
Japanese buskers
People from Okayama
1982 births
Living people
Avex Group artists